Beaver Dam Creek is a stream in the U.S. state of South Dakota.

Beaver Dam Creek contained several beaver dams, hence the name.

See also
List of rivers of South Dakota

References

Rivers of Meade County, South Dakota
Rivers of South Dakota